This is a list of compositions by Armenian composer Aram Khachaturian.

Ballets
Shchastye ("Happiness"; Yerevan, 1939)
Gayane (1939–41), which includes the famous Sabre Dance
Spartacus (1950–54)

Orchestral
Symphonies
Symphony No. 1 (1934)
Symphony No. 2 The Bell Symphony (two versions: 1943, 1944)
Symphony No. 3 Symphony-Poem (1947)
Dance Suite (1933)
Suite from Gayane No. 1 (1943)
Suite from Gayane No. 2 (1943)
Suite from Gayane No. 3 (1943)
State Anthem of the Armenian SSR (1944)
The Russian Fantasy  (1944)
Suite from Masquerade (1944)
Ode in Memory of Vladimir Ilich Lenin (1948)
Suite from Battle of Stalingrad (1949)
Triumphal Poem, a festive poem (1950)
Suite from The Valencian Widow (1952)
Suite from Spartacus No. 1 (1955)
Suite from Spartacus No. 2 (1955)
Suite from Spartacus No. 3 (1955)
Symphonic Pictures from Spartacus (1955)
Greeting (or Salutatory) Overture (1958)
Suite from Lermontov (1959)

Vocal orchestral
Poem about Stalin (1938)
Three Arias (Poem, Legend, Dithyramb), for high pitched voice and orchestra (1946)
Ode of Joy, ballade for female soloist, chorus, violins, harps, and orchestra (1956)
Ballade about Motherland, for soloist and symphony orchestra (1961)

Pieces

Concertos
Piano Concerto in D-flat major (1936)
Violin Concerto in D minor (1940)
Cello Concerto in E minor (1946)
Concerto-Rhapsody for violin and orchestra (1961)
Concerto-Rhapsody for cello and orchestra (1963)
Concerto-Rhapsody for piano and orchestra (1968)

Chamber
String Quartet (1931)
Trio for Clarinet, Violin and Piano (1932)

Instrumental
Roaming Ashug's Song for cello and piano (1925)
Elegy for cello and piano (1925)
Piece for cello and piano (1926)
Dance No. 1 for violin and piano (1926)
Dream for cello and piano (1927)
Pantomime for oboe and piano (1927)
Allegretto for violin and piano (1929)
Song-Poem (in Honor of Ashugs) for violin and piano (1929)
Suite for viola and piano (1929)
Mass Dance for bayan (1932)
Violin Sonata (1932)
Nocturne from Masquerade for violin and piano (1941)
Sonata-Fantasia for unaccompanied cello (1974)
Sonata-Monologue for unaccompanied violin (1975)
Sonata-Song for solo viola (1976)

Piano
Poem (1925)
Waltz-Etude (1926)
Andantino (1926)
Poem (1927)
Variations on the Theme "Solveig" (1928)
Seven Recitatives and Fugues (1928, 1966)
Suite (Toccata, Waltz-Capriccio, Dance) (1932; the Toccata is now best known as a piece separate from the suite)
Dance No. 3 (1933)
March No. 3 (1934)
Budenovka, a mass dance (undated)
Choreographic Waltz (1944)
Three Pieces for two pianos (Ostinato, Romance, Fantastic Waltz) (1945)
Album for Children No. 1, 10 pieces (1947)
Waltz from Masquerade (1952)
Piano Sonatina (1959)
Piano Sonata (1961)
Album for Children No. 2 (1965)
Adventures of Ivan

Incidental music
Uncle Baghdasar (1927)
Khatabala (1928)
Oriental Dentist (1928)
Debt of Honor (1931)
Macbeth (1933)
Devastated Home (1935)
Great Day (1937)
Baku (1937)
The Valencian Widow (1940)
Masquerade (1941)
Kremlin Chimes (1942)
Sound Scout (1943)
The Last Day (1945)
Southern Bale (1947)
Tale About The Truth (1947)
Ilya Golovin (1949)
Spring Current (1953)
Guardian Angel from Nebraska (1953)
Lermontov (1954)
Macbeth (1955)
King Lear (1958)

Film scores
 Pepo (1934-5)
 Zangezur (1937-8)
 The Garden (1939)
 Salavat Yulayev (1941)
 Girl No. 217 (1945)
 The Russian Question (1948)
 Vladimir Ilich Lenin (1948-9)
 The Battle of Stalingrad (1949)
 They Have a Native Country (1950)
 Secret Mission (1950)
 Admiral Ushakov (1953)
 Ships Storming the Bastions (1953)
 Saltanat (1955)
 Othello (1956)
 Undying Flame (1956)
 The Duel (1957)
 The Tocsin of Peace (1962)
 Those People of the Nile (1972)

Brass band
Combat March No. 1 (1929)
Combat March No. 2 (1930)
Dancing Music (on the theme of an Armenian song) (1932)
March No. 3 (Uzbek March) (1932)
Dance (on the theme of an Armenian song) (1932)
To the Heroes of the Patriotic War, a march (1942)
March of the Moscow Red Banner Militia (1973)

 
Lists of compositions by composer